Alejandra Garza (born 1 August 1991) is a Mexican weightlifter. She competed in the women's 75 kg event at the 2016 Summer Olympics.

References

External links
 

1991 births
Living people
Mexican female weightlifters
Olympic weightlifters of Mexico
Weightlifters at the 2016 Summer Olympics
Place of birth missing (living people)
20th-century Mexican women
21st-century Mexican women